Chiemgauer is a regional local currency started in 2003 in Prien am Chiemsee, Bavaria, Germany. Named after the Chiemgau, a region around the Chiemsee lake, it is intended to increase local employment, supporting local culture, and make the local food supply more resilient. The Chiemgauer operates with a fixed exchange rate, tied to the value of the euro: 1 Chiemgauer = €1.

History
In 2003, Christian Gelleri, a high school teacher, started this project with his students, who are in charge of designing and printing vouchers and take care of administration, accounting, advertising, and other tasks. Chiemgauer is a member of a regional currencies' network called Regiogeld (regiomoney association). Gelleri had been inspired by the economists Silvio Gesell and Rudolf Steiner, and by the former's Freigeld.

The Chiemgauer is intended for:
 Employment creation: unemployed, students, and volunteers are hired to work, earning some allowances
 Promotion of cultural, educational and environmental activities: the Chiemgauer system supports nonprofits who work for such purposes
 Promotion of sustainability: organic food and renewable energy among others
 Strengthening the solidarity: enhancing the human relationship between local shoppers and businesses
 Stimulation of local economy: The Chiemgauer retains purchasing power within the region better than the euro and favors local small businesses, stimulating transactions through demurrage.
 Express-Money: Example for a complementary currency on a national level 

In 2006, an electronic form of the Chiemgauer, the "eChiemgauer", was established. Bank accounts are used for operations; this has been made possible through cooperation with cooperative and local banks. Only businesses and nonprofits need additional electronic accounts, while consumers have the possibility to use electronic cards called "Regiocard". Two-thirds of Chiemgauer turnover is electronic. The demurrage is 6% per year (between 2003 and 2015: 8%).

Chiemgauer use has grown and can be found primarily in Bavaria between Munich, Germany, and Salzburg, Austria (Germany, Austria, and Switzerland combined had 30 regional currency systems as of 2009).

Overview

Chiemgauer, whose value is fixed to the euro, circulates as follows within the districts of Rosenheim and Traunstein:
 Issuing office: Consumers can change euros into Chiemgauer at about 40 issuing offices.
 Consumers: Exchange Chiemgauer 1 to 1. €100 are exchanged for 100 Chiemgauer. Chiemgauer can be spent at local businesses at face value, thereby helping both local nonprofits and businesses without any further cost. As a "bonus", those exchanging their euros for Chiemgauer choose a non-profit which receives 3% of the value exchanged.
 Businesses: Accept Chiemgauer at face value and spend them for their own purchases, but also have the option to exchange 100 Chiemgauer for €95, losing 5% for commission but earning more by attracting Chiemgauer members to their products and/or services. Of this, €2 is allocated to administrative costs, and €3 represents the donation to a nonprofit when the Chiemgauer were originally bought.
 Nonprofits: Receive 3% of any amount of euros exchanged for Chiemgauer. This motivates supporters to participate in the project. In the registration form consumers choose which nonprofit to support.

Demurrage
Bills of 1, 2, 5, 10, 20, and 50 Chiemgauer are issued. To maintain an individual bill's validity, a "scrip" corresponding to 2% of the banknote value must be paid every three months. This system, called demurrage, is a form of currency circulation tax invented by Silvio Gesell. Specifically:

...in order to prevent this complementary currency from degenerating into a means of hoarding and to confer it on high liquidity. It is required to put a stamp of 2% of the face value (€0.10 for 5 Chiemgauer, for instance) every three months to keep it valid, obliging its bearers to give up hoarding this complementary currency and to spend it as soon as possible and stimulating consequently the regional economy.

Because it loses value every quarter, users are incentivized to spend the money. The notes have an expiry date after which they need to be renewed with a sticker costing 2% of their value. The quicker money is spent, the faster, in macroeconomic terms, its velocity. Gesell argued that a higher velocity of money helps combat deflation.

Businesses and nonprofits
There are different rules for nonprofits and businesses. Nonprofits can purchase 100 Chiemgauer at €97, potentially increasing the value of their money by 3%. On the other hand, businesses that accept Chiemgauer are subject to 5% commission fee if they want to change it back to euros, which incentivizes them to work within the system and also potentially increase Chiemgauer users by, for example, getting local suppliers to accept payments in Chiemgauer.

No interest 

Since 2007, Chiemgauer could be saved without interest at a social cooperative called REGIOS. Likewise, a microcredit program for businesses and nonprofits has existed since 2010 and loans are available in amounts ranging from €1,000 to €20,000. Interest is calculated at a rate of 9%, but when a loan issued in Chiemgauer is paid back on time and without fault, the entire interest costs are paid back to the debtor.

Data

See also

BerkShares
Complementary currencies
Demurrage (currency)
Local currency
Urstromtaler
WIR Bank
Wörgl

External links

References

Local currencies
Freiwirtschaft
Currencies of Germany